Gabriel Adao Martínez de la Rosa (born September 24, 1975) is a Mexican football manager and former player. He was born in Mexico City.

References

1975 births
Living people
Footballers from Mexico City
Mexican footballers
Mexican football managers
Association football defenders
Club Universidad Nacional footballers
C.F. Pachuca players
Correcaminos UAT footballers
Liga MX players
Ascenso MX players